Ludwik Marian Kurnatowski was a Polish public official and author.

Publications 
 Branka cyganów (1931)
 Szpilka z trupią główką (1931; republished 2014)
 Tajemnica Belwederu (1931; republished 2014)
 Obłęd złota (1932)
 Od 1908 do dzisiaj (1932)

Bibliography 

 Ludwik M. Kurnatowski [w:] Ludwik M. Kurnatowski, Tajemnica Belwederu (Kryminały przedwojennej Warszawy), Warszawa 2014.
 Jan Zbrożek, Ucieczka komisarza policji, [w:] Stolica, nr 39, 1967
 Głos Polski, 17 I 1928

Writers from Warsaw
Polish crime writers
20th-century Polish writers
20th-century Polish male writers